V.K.Thanabalan is an Indian travel agent and media figure in Chennai, Tamil Nadu, who is popular by the name V.K.T. Balan.  .

Biography 
V.K.T.Balan (Veerasangili Kannaiah Thanabalan) was born in Thiruchendur, Thoothukudi district, in the State of Tamil Nadu which is in southern India. He travelled to Chennai, the capital of Tamil Nadu, in 1981 and lived homeless at Chennai Egmore railway station. He made money by standing in the queue for people waiting at the American Embassy for visas, charging a few rupees a time to reserve a place for customers. He made acquaintances with people in the travel industry and opened his own travel agency in 1986.

The Government of Tamil Nadu conferred Balan with the "Kalaimamani" award and the citation was given to Balan by the then Tamil Nadu Governor Ms. Fathima Beevi. The then Tamil Nadu Chief Minister M.Karunanidhi presented the shawl and gave him the "Thanga Pathakam" (Gold Award). Balan launched Tamil Nadu's first Internet Radio channel, World Tamil News, in 2001. He currently presents a television program Velichatin Marupakkam meaning "the other side of the light" on Podhigai TV

Early life 

Balan was born in a town called Thiruchendur, which is situated on the southern tip of Tamil Nadu seashore. His parents belonged to a caste to which all the social rights are refused. They were daily wage earners and the food and clothes they received were actually already used pieces and the leftover eatables (food) of affluent classes of society. Under the government's primary education system Balan got an opportunity to study only up to 8th standard, in his life. The age-long social atrocities created a deep-seated anger in Balan. Balan took a vow that he would not do any work which affects his self-respect. Empty-handed Balan took a train to Chennai,  of course,  without even procuring the train ticket. In fact Balan's parents were unaware of their son's departure.

Balan arrived at Egmore Railway station in Chennai in the year 1981. There he saw an altogether different world. Everyone was so busy that they didn't know even their neighbours. The biggest problem was that he had neither relatives nor friends in Chennai. He knocked the gates of several travel companies and travel hotels pleading for job. After knocking the doors of more than 100 companies he realized that no owner will employ a person like him without.

Balan also noticed that the Egmore Railway Station's pedestrian platform was the staying place for rickshaw pullers and other poor people.  Balan also slept on that pedestrian platform one night. And this continued. Unbearable hunger, deep anxiety about his employment, tears in his eyes and worn out clothes, all,  made him look like a beggar. Balan's condition became worse as days passed.

One day when he was sleeping in his usual place a lathi landed on his body. Balan's stomach was also empty as he could not afford his dinner that evening. Balan woke up and saw a policeman standing in front of him. Then that police man asked Balan his name. "Balan" came the reply. Then the policeman got furious and asked Balan "I asked your name, how dare you tell my name ?" A confused Balan looked on the police badge on his shirt and realized that the police man's name was also Balan. Balan's nose was profusely bleeding due to the policeman's lathi charge.Then that policeman ordered Balan to go and stand with 5 or 6 people who were also under police arrest. Balan sincerely obeyed the order. Balan did not understand what was going on and asked one of those 5-6 persons, "what is going on?" Then that person explained, "Look, the target for them is 75 cases. If the police are unable to meet the target, they book people like us, who are in fact innocent but are on streets due to our fates. Now we all will be sent to the jail.  It means Balan will be sent to prison next morning. Suddenly Balan gathered courage and ran from that place . But the concerned policeman also started chasing Balan. In Balan's own words "It was like the cat chasing a mouse. The cat is after its food whereas the mouse is running to save its life." Moreover, this policeman was potbellied and could never keep up with Balan's pace.

After running for few furlongs Balan stopped and looked back and found that the police man is no longer chasing him. A tired Balan started to walk slowly. After just a few yards he found a few people sleeping in a row on the platform. Balan first sat there and then started slept alongside. Finally the next morning at 5’0 clock Balan woke up and found that there were 20 people in front of him and 200 behind him. One person approached him and asked "Could you give me your place.. I will give you Rs. 2 for that" so Balan gave his place in the "Q" for Rs. 2. The incident happened in front of the American Consulate in Chennai.

When he enquired he came to know that people who wanted to go to America are standing there to procure their visa. A few people who did not want to stand in the "Q" deputize a person to stand in the "Q" on their behalf. Even in those days people have to stand for hours together to get their visa. Balan was extremely happy. He realized that finally he has a job, which will fetch him food, income and safety. His income multiplied when he started using a stone or towel and claimed that those places were reserved. While standing in the "Q" he got acquainted with travel agents. This friendship with travel agents helped him a lot to know flight ticket rates, details about Visa and other details required to travel abroad. Balan excellently used this opportunity to fetch visas, flight tickets and other important documents for those traveling abroad. Sometimes Balan used to carry the luggage of the tourists and travel with them to the airport. Balan got an aim in life and that is customers’ satisfaction . This aim helped him to move closer to the travel agents in and around Chennai. Balan's general habits, his integrity in his professional life and his hard labour earned him a good name and many valuable contacts.

Several travel agents came forward to provide loan of several lakhs of rupees. With this as capital Balan started Madura Travel Service (P) Ltd on 17 January 1986. Today has a turn over of Rs. 20 crore and more. Moreover, today Balan is running his business at his own building, which is just opposite to Egmore railway station. It is an IATA Accredited Agency as well.  It is a Member of Travel Agents Association of India TAAI, the oldest travel agents association in the country.

Further has membership in TAFI, IAAI,  IATO, SIHRA, FHRAI, Indian Railway, IRCTC, India Tourism   & also got tourism departments recognition including that of Government of India Tourism, and recognitions in states like Gujarat, Kerala, Rajasthan, Uttar Pradesh, Madhya Pradesh, Karnataka, Andhra Pradesh, Punjab, Goa, Jammu & Kashmir, Delhi, Orissa, Bihar, Himachal Pradesh, Meghalaya and Tripura, Andaman and Tamil Nadu. The Reserve Bank has recognized the firm as one of its foreign exchangers in India.

Balan was instrumental in introducing 365 days and 24 hours travel services in Tamil Nadu.  He has been appointed as a member of Tourism Advisory Committee by the Tamil Nadu Government. It is a great honour for his experience.

Limca Book Of Records 

In the year 1992 he had arranged a Gala Music Festival by bringing together almost all the Tamil Film industry music artists together and presented the video cassette to the then President R. Venkataraman who officially released the same.  It is kept as a treasure in the Tamil homes Worldwide. From 1987 to 2007 by bringing together thousands of artists, Balan had conducted more than 200 cultural programmes in 25 countries and more. This activity has been recorded as an achievement in the Limca Book of Records. This fetched a great name for Balan as well as for Tamil language and the state of Tamil Nadu.

Kalaimamani Award 
The Government of Tamil Nadu had conferred Balan with the “Kalaimamani” award and the citation was given to Balan by the then Tamil Nadu Governor Ms. Fathima Beevi. The then Tamil Nadu Chief Minister M.Karunanidhi presented the shawl and gave him the “Thanga Pathakam” (Golden Award).

Balan had also established an Institute by the name “Madura Institute”. This Institute imparts training related to all information regarding Air Travel. In this Institute, training is given free of cost for those persons who are physically challenged. Those physically challenged persons were also given immediate jobs as soon as they finished their training.  It has the credit of training a physically challenged to get his IATA qualification & employing him as an assistant manager.

Balan had also started “madura welcome” a travel guide for those visiting Tamil Nadu. He is the author-cum-publisher of “madura welcome” an English Book. This book is greatly helping foreign embassies, consulates, airline companies, hotels, travel agents and tourists. The books titled  Biography of Kamaraj, Guide Book on Tamil Nadu& Kerala were procured by the Government of Tamil Nadu and these are in all the state government owned libraries throughout Tamil Nadu.

Balan is the first person to launch an Internet Radio in Tamil Nadu. He started this in the year 2001 and it is called www.worldtamilnews.com. It is also called as “Tamil Kural”. This is the world's first Internet Radio in Tamil with the credit of India's First Internet Radio.  This site is visited by more than two lakh people each day. None can compete with “worldtamilnews.com” in providing news items with great speed and accuracy.

The Government owned Doordarshan is running a Tamil channel by the name “Pothigai”. In this channel Balan is conducting a program by name “Velichatin Marupakkam” meaning “the other side of the light”. In this program Balan has interviewed several persons who are physically challenged but achieved or achieving great things in life. Balan has received thousands of congratulatory letters and people welcomed it as a wonderful program.

Colleges invite him to give motivational speeches as well as lectures for their students despite being have studied in any college. He leads life giving importance to Tourism & Human Values without any boundaries: caste, creed & Politics.

Family 
His mother is Isakkiammal. His father is Late Kanniah. His wife is Susheela & have one daughter, Saranya,  and one son, Sriharan. He is a very simple man as he wears only Kadhar Dhoti, shirt, Hawai slippers. In his forehead Balan always applies sandalwood paste (Sandanam) and Kungumam.

Today Balan is searching for that policeman who wanted to arrest Balan, and wants to present him a gold ring.

References

External links 
 ABOUT V.K.T. Balan

Television personalities from Tamil Nadu
Living people
1954 births
Recipients of the Kalaimamani Award